Bolešiny is a municipality and village in Klatovy District in the Plzeň Region of the Czech Republic. It has about 800 inhabitants.

Administrative parts
Villages of Domažličky, Kroměždice, Pečetín, Slavošovice and Újezdec are administrative parts of Bolešiny.

Gallery

References

Villages in Klatovy District